Psalm 2 is the second psalm of the Book of Psalms, beginning in English in the King James Version: "Why do the heathen rage". In Latin, it is known as "Quare fremuerunt gentes". Psalm 2 does not identify its author with a superscription, but Acts  in the New Testament attributes it to David. According to the Talmud, Psalm 2 is a continuation of Psalm 1.

The psalm is a regular part of Jewish, Catholic, Lutheran, Anglican and other Protestant liturgies. It has often been set to music; George Frideric Handel set nine verses in Part II of his Messiah.

Background and themes
According to the Talmud (Berakhot 10b), Psalm 2 is a continuation of Psalm 1. 10th-century rabbi Saadia Gaon, in his commentary on the Psalms, notes that Psalm 1 begins with the word "Happy" and the last verse of Psalm 2 ends with the word "Happy", joining them thematically.

According to the Talmud and commentators such as Saadia Gaon, Abraham ibn Ezra, and the Karaite Yefet ben Ali, this psalm is messianic, referring to the advent of the Jewish Messiah who will be preceded by the wars of Gog and Magog. In this vein, the "king" of Psalm 2 is interpreted not as David but as the future King Messiah from the Davidic line, who will restore Israel to its former glory and bring world peace. The Talmud teaches (Sukkah 52a): 
Our Rabbis taught: The Holy One, blessed be He, will say to the Messiah, the son of David (May he reveal himself speedily in our days!), "Ask of me anything, and I will give it to you", as it is said, "I will tell of the decree ... this day have I begotten thee. Ask of me and I will give the nations for your inheritance" (Psalms 2:7–8).

Similarly, the Midrash Tehillim teaches:
 R. Jonathan said: "Three persons were bidden, 'Ask'—Solomon, Ahaz, and the King Messiah. Solomon: 'Ask what I shall give thee' (I Kings 3:5). Ahaz: 'Ask thee a sign' (Isaiah 7:11). The King Messiah: 'Ask of Me', etc. (Psalms 2:8)."

Rashi and Radak, however, identify the subject of this psalm as David, following his victory over the Philistines. Arenda suggests that Rashi's view was influenced by that of early Christian commentators who interpreted verse 7 as referring to Christ.

Christian writers such as Hermann Gunkel and Hans Joachin Kras<ref>"Hans-Joachim Kraus, Psalmen 1–63. 1. Teilband, (Neukirchen-Vluyn 1972), p13f.</ref> see the psalm as a song of the Judean king himself at the festival of his accession, while Hossfeld sees the psalm as merely being influenced by the Egyptian and Hellenistic royal ideology.

Most Christian scholars interpret the subject of the psalm as Jesus Christ and his role as the Messiah. Matthew Henry interprets verses 1–6 are viewed as threats against Christ's kingdom, verses 7–9 as a promise to Christ to be the head of this kingdom, and verses 10–12 as counsel to all to serve Christ. Charles Spurgeon and Adam Clarke similarly interpret the psalm as referring to the opposition against Christ's rulership, the selection of Christ by God as his "own son", and the eventual victory and reign of Christ over his enemies.

Text
Hebrew Bible version
Following is the Hebrew text of Psalm 2:

King James Version
 Why do the heathen rage, and the people imagine a vain thing?
 The kings of the earth set themselves, and the rulers take counsel together, against the Lord, and against his anointed, saying,
 Let us break their bands asunder, and cast away their cords from us.
 He that sitteth in the heavens shall laugh: the Lord shall have them in derision.
 Then shall he speak unto them in his wrath, and vex them in his sore displeasure.
 Yet have I set my king upon my holy hill of Zion.
 I will declare the decree: the Lord hath said unto me, Thou art my Son; this day have I begotten thee.
 Ask of me, and I shall give thee the heathen for thine inheritance, and the uttermost parts of the earth for thy possession.
 Thou shalt break them with a rod of iron; thou shalt dash them in pieces like a potter's vessel.
 Be wise now therefore, O ye kings: be instructed, ye judges of the earth.
 Serve the Lord with fear, and rejoice with trembling.
 Kiss the Son, lest he be angry, and ye perish from the way, when his wrath is kindled but a little. Blessed are all they that put their trust in him.

Uses
Judaism
Verse 1 is recited during Selichot.

This psalm is also recited to alleviate a headache, and when caught in a sea gale.

New Testament
Some verses of Psalm 2 are referenced in the New Testament:
 Verses 1-2: in a speech attributed to Peter and John in Acts .
 Verse 7: in Acts 13:33; Hebrews 1:5; Hebrews 5:5.
 Verses 8-9: in Revelation ; 12:5; 19:15.

Catholic Church
According to the Rule of St. Benedict (530 AD), Psalms 1 to 20 were mainly reserved for the office of Prime. This psalm was chosen by St. Benedict of Nursia for Monday's the office of Prime: in the Rule of St. Benedict of 530 it was recited or sung between Psalm 1 and Psalm 6.

In the Liturgy of the Hours, Psalm 2 is sung or recited in the Office of Readings of the Sunday of the first week, with Psalm 1 and Psalm 3. Every Tuesday, the faithful of Opus Dei, after invoking their Guardian Angel and kissing the rosary, recite Psalm 2 in Latin.

Book of Common Prayer
In the Church of England's Book of Common Prayer, Psalm 2 is appointed to be read on the morning of the first day of the month.

Musical settings
In 1567, Thomas Tallis set Psalm 2, "Why fum'th in sight", for his Nine Tunes for Archbishop Parker's Psalter. Heinrich Schütz wrote a setting of a paraphrase in German, "Was haben doch die Leut im Sinn", SWV 098, for the Becker Psalter, published first in 1628.

Psalm 2 is one of the psalms used in Handel's "Messiah" (HWV 56).

In France, Pierre Robert composed a grand motet "Quare fremuerunt gentes", for the Chapelle Royale in the Louvre. Marc-Antoine Charpentier set around 1675 one " Quare fremuerunt gentes" H.168 - H.168 a, for soloists, double chorus, strings and continuo, another one, for 3 voices, 2 treble instruments and continuo H.184, around 1682. Michel-Richard de Lalande in 1706 made his grand motet (S70) on this Psalm. Jean-Baptiste Lully did the same.

Felix Mendelssohn wrote a setting of Psalm 2 in German during his time as Generalmusicdirektor for church music in Berlin.  The setting is for two four part choirs with sections for solo voices and was first performed in Berlin Cathedral on the first day of Christmas 1843.  "Warum toben die Heiden" was published as his Op 78 No 1.

Verse 8 of Psalm 2 is used in the song "You Said" by Reuben Morgan.

Verses 1–4 form one of the texts Leonard Bernstein used for his Chichester Psalms. It is used as counterpart to Psalm 23 in the second movement, sung by the tenors and basses.

 References in Second Temple Jewish Literature 

 Dead Sea Scrolls 

 4Q174: This text, also called 4QFlorilegium, is an explanation (pesher) on several Messianic texts. It reads, “‘Why do the nations conspire, and the peoples plot in vain? The kings of the earth set themselves, and the rulers take counsel together against the LORD and His anointed’ [Ps 2:1]. The meaning is that the nations shall set themselves and conspire vainly against the chosen of Israel in the Last Days."
1QSA: This reference is debated, and either states "When God has fathered [יולד] the Messiah among them" or "When God has caused the Messiah to come [יולך] among them." If the former, it is likely a reference to Ps 2:7.

 1 Enoch 
There is a clear reference to Psalm 2 in 1 Enoch, found in 1En. 48:8-10. This text states that "downcast will be the faces of the kings of the earth" who have "denied the Lord of Spirits and his anointed one". The phrase "kings of the earth" and "Lord...and his anointed one" point back to Ps 2:2.

 Psalms of Solomon 
Sol.'' 17:23-24. Those verses read, "To smash the arrogance of the sinner like a potter’s vessel, to shatter all their substance with an iron rod."

Controversy
English-speaking Protestant Christians commonly (but not always) translate verse 12 as "Kiss the son", as in the King James Version. The most common Jewish interpretation is "Embrace purity", an interpretation close to that of Catholics, who traditionally follow the Vulgate and translate the phrase as "Embrace discipline". To translate as "Kiss the son", the word "bar" must be read as Aramaic ("son", but in Hebrew, "son" is "ben") rather than Hebrew ("purity") or Septuagint and Vulgate "discipline", "training", "teaching". The New American Bible reconciles by combining verses 11 and 12 of other translations into a single verse 11. Some Jewish authors have accused Protestant Christians of arbitrarily choosing to interpret the word as in a different language to give the text a meaning more favourable to Christians ("son", understood as Jesus).

See also
Anointing
Blessing
Heaven
Old Testament messianic prophecies quoted in the New Testament
Heathen (Pagan)
Zion

References

External links 

 
 
 Text of Psalm 2 according to the 1928 Psalter
 Psalms Chapter 2 text in Hebrew and English, mechon-mamre.org
United States Conference of Catholic Bishops, Why do the nations protest and the peoples conspire in vain? text and footnotes, usccb.org 
 Psalm 2:1 introduction and text, biblestudytools.com
 Psalm 2 – The Reign of the LORD‘s Anointed enduringword.com
 Psalm 2 / Refrain: The Lord is the strength of his people, a safe refuge for his anointed. Church of England
 Psalm 2 at biblegateway.com
 Hymns for Psalm 2 hymnary.org

002
Works attributed to David